Jacobus Luberti Augustini (30 April 1748, in Haarlem – 4 August 1822, in Haarlem), was an 18th-century painter from the northern Netherlands.

Biography
Augustini was born in Haarlem as the son of the landscape painter Jan Augustini who made large wall decorations and who taught him to paint. He started his career as a painter of allegorical works, and later stopped due to accepting a position as tax collector. When he lost his job due to the circumstances beyond his control, he started a small publishing house in Haarlem. Besides allegorical works, he is also known for portraits.

References

1725 births
1773 deaths
18th-century Dutch painters
18th-century Dutch male artists
Dutch male painters
Artists from Haarlem